Lorry Driver is a 1990 Telugu-language action film, produced by S. Jaya Rama Rao under the Jaya Productions banner, presented by Rao Gopal Rao and directed by B. Gopal. It stars Nandamuri Balakrishna, Vijayashanti  and music composed by Chakravarthy. The film was recorded as a Super Hit at the box office. The film marked the first collaboration of director B. Gopal with Balakrishna.

Plot
The film is set in the backdrop of a lorry driver's union. They are compelled to work under a power-hungry owner Ranganayakulu (Raja Krishna Murthy) and thereby becoming victims of exploitation. The owner acts like he helps our lorry drivers to become independent, but frame them in smuggling and illegal cases. A fearless Lorry Driver, Balamurali (Nandamuri Balakrishna) questions this exploitation and demands rights for the union. An IAS Officer, Collector Lalitha Devi (Sharada) and her husband SP Pradeep Kumar (Vijayakumar) also helps  Balamurali, in this regard, Jayamma (Vijayashanti) is ideal as his female lead with mass orientation.

Cast

Soundtrack

Music composed by Chakravarthy. Music released on Lahari Music Company.

References

External links
 

1990 films
Trucker films
Films directed by B. Gopal
Films scored by K. Chakravarthy
1990s Telugu-language films